Kaili (Hmu language: Kad Linx) is a county-level city under the administration of Qiandongnan Miao and Dong Autonomous Prefecture, in southeastern Guizhou province, People's Republic of China. It is the center of Miao culture, hosting more than 120 festivals every year. Kaili has a population of 478,642 in 2010 and is a major producer of rice.

History
The name "Kaili" is from the Miao Hmu language, meaning "newly cultivated land".

Miao people

A significant population of Miao and Gejia (officially classified as Miao) live in Kaili. Kaili is host to more than 120 Miao festivals throughout the year. The Miao are known for arts and crafts, including jewelry, embroidery, brocade, batik, and papercutting.

Geography and climate
Kaili experiences a monsoon-influenced humid subtropical climate (Köppen Cwa/Cfa) with cool, dry winters and hot, wet summers.
The postal code for Kaili is 556000.

Administration
Kaili City is divided 7 subdistricts, 9 towns and 2 townships. Dashizhi subdistrict is the city seat which houses Kaili City Government and Kaili City Council.
Subdistricts: Dashizi, Chengxi, Ximen, Yatang, Wanxi, Kaihuai, Ximahe
Towns: Sankeshu, Zhouxi, Panghai, Wanshui, Lushan, Wanchao, Longchang, Xiasi, Bibo
Townships: Kaitang, Dafengdong

Education

Colleges
Kaili University
Qiandongnan National Polytechnic College
GuiZhou Vocational Technology College of Electronics & Information
Qiandongnan Radio and television university
Kaili Career Technical College
Qiandongnan state school of administration

Technical school
Guizhou Agricultural mechanical and electrical school
Kaili first vocational technical school
Qiandongnan School of Applied Technology
Qiandongnan national medium vocational technical school
Qiandongnan Vocational and technical school

Secondary school
 Kaili No.1 High School of Guizhou Province

Transportation

Road
China National Highway 320
S308, S306

Expressway
G60
G76
Yuqing–Anlong Expressway, Kaili–Leishan Expressway

Railway
Shanghai–Kunming High-Speed Railway-Kaili South Railway Station
Shanghai–Kunming Railway-Kaili Railway Station

Airport
Kaili City is served by Kaili Huangping Airport located at Huangping County.

References

External links
Travel China Guide
Frommer's

Cities in Guizhou
County-level divisions of Guizhou
Qiandongnan Miao and Dong Autonomous Prefecture